First Empire: The International Magazine for the Napoleonic Enthusiast, Historian, and Gamer was a bimonthly Napoleonic history magazine published in Bridgnorth, the United Kingdom. The magazine was in circulation between 1991 and 2011 and produced a total of 117 issue during its existence.

Notable authors
Professor Christopher Blackburn of the University of Louisiana at Monroe wrote an article on "Napoleon & Poland" for the magazine. The author explained, "First Empire remains popular and maintains a large international readership because its subscribers, whether professional historians or enthusiastic re-enactors, hold the common bond of being interested in the history of the Napoleonic Era ... It’s a great place to publish because too often academic historians are writing only for other historians and not for the community that just love to explore our past."

Table of issues

Reception
Max Sewell, a Fellow of the International Napoleonic Society praises the magazine as "the result of the hard work and devotion of a number of individuals who donate their time and effort to writing and reporting on their interests, travels, and studies. They do not appear to be paid for their efforts, but we are all rewarded by their fine work." By contrast, a more critical reviewer rates "First Empire a 'try before you buy.' What strikes me as a lack of focus may strike you as wonderful breadth and variety. Nuggets that feel to me unconnected and wandering may appeal to you. But at about $55 per year (6 issues) it is not a subscription to be picked up on a whim."

Demise
Following the printer of this journal ceasing to trade, the magazine itself has stopped production; issue 116 was the last to be printed, in January 2011, and issue 117 was the last to be produced in digital form.

Death of the founder
Dave Watkins, founder and editor of First Empire and fellow of the International Napoleonic Society, died on 3 June 2015 after suffering from pancreatic cancer.

References

Bi-monthly magazines published in the United Kingdom
Defunct magazines published in the United Kingdom
History magazines published in the United Kingdom
Magazines established in 1991
Magazines disestablished in 2011